Robert Lyons Danly (January 3, 1947 – April 27, 1997) was an award-winning writer, editor and translator of Japanese language and literature. He was also a teacher.

Awards and recognition
Danly's awards include:

 Class of 1923 Award at the University of Michigan for outstanding teaching of undergraduates in 1984.
 The 1982 National Book Award for his translation of ‘In the Shade of Spring Leaves: The Life and Writings of Higuchi Ichiyo; A Woman of Letters in Meiji Japan.'
 1983–84 National Endowment of the Humanities grant.
 Establishment (in 2006) of the 1969 a Memorial Travel Fellowship in his name which is given to Yale University undergraduate students pursuing studying and researching in Japan over the summer. It is made possible through the generosity of Malcolm M. Brown, M.D.

References

20th-century American translators
Translators to English
Translators from Japanese
University of Michigan faculty
National Book Award winners
Yale University alumni
1947 births
1997 deaths